Mathieu Montcourt was the defending champion. He lost to Miguel Ángel López Jaén in the first round.
Paolo Lorenzi defeated Jean-René Lisnard in the final 7–5, 1–6, 6–2.

Seeds

Draw

Final four

Top half

Bottom half

References
 Main Draw
 Qualifying Draw

Camparini Gioielli Cup - Singles
Camparini Gioielli Cup